La mia banda suona il pop is a 2020 Italian comedy film directed by Fausto Brizzi.

Cast

References

External links

2020 films
Films directed by Fausto Brizzi
Films scored by Bruno Zambrini
2020s Italian-language films
2020 comedy films
Italian comedy films
2020s Italian films